General elections were held in Gibraltar on 28 November 2003. They were won by Peter Caruana's Gibraltar Social Democrats (GSD), who took over 50% of the popular vote and 8 of the 15 available seats, making this their third successive win.

Results

External links
 Results of the 2003 Gibraltar Elections

2003
Gibraltar
General
Gibraltar
Election and referendum articles with incomplete results